Ilūkste is a town in Augšdaugava Municipality in the Selonia region of Latvia. The population in 2020 was 2,216.

History 
Territory of modern Ilūkste was inhabited by ancient baltic tribe- Selonians. As a settlement Ilūkste started to grow in the beginning of 16th century when it was part of Livonian Confederation and was administered by Komtur of Daugavpils. Ilūkste was first mentioned in written sources in 1559 as a small village, part of the estate lands of Count Kasper Sieberg.
After secularization of Livonian Order Ilūkste became part of Duchy of Courland and Semigallia. In 1567 lutheran church was built in Ilūkste. Many Russian Old-Believers found refuge in Ilūkste during this period.
During 17th century local landowner Bartholomew Zieberg offered refugee to Jesuits who were expelled from Swedish controlled Riga. As a result, wooden Catholic church was built in Ilūkste in 1690. In the 18th century Jesuits constructed a large Catholic church with two towers which at that time was one of the biggest in Latvia.

After the Duchy of Courland was incorporated in the Russian Empire in 1795, thanks to its strategic location at the crossroads of Lithuania, Belarus and Daugavpils, Ilūkste became an important trade city and regional center.
In 1816 Uniat church was built in Ilūkste. In 19th century many Jewish merchants settled in Ilūkste and annual fairs were held. In 1840 highway from St. Petersburg to Warsaw was constructed nearby which stimulated further development. In 1865 new Lutheran church was built. In 1873 railway line Daugavpils-Tilsit was constructed through the town.
In 1910 Russian teacher institute was opened in Ilūkste.

In World War I, Ilūkste was situated on the fighting front line, and by the war's end the city was totally destroyed. There were no intact houses left in Ilūkste and also all churches were damaged. Ilūkste was granted town rights in 1917 however it never fully regained its pre-war level of prosperity. In 1927 a new school building was constructed in town and Latvian poet, playwright and at that moment Minister of Education Rainis participated in the opening ceremony.

During the Soviet period, some industries shifted from Daugavpils to Ilūkste.

Gallery

See also 
List of cities in Latvia

References

External links

 
Towns in Latvia
Augšdaugava Municipality
Illuxt County
Selonia